Li Jun (born November 20, 1985 in Shanghai) is a Chinese sport shooter. He won a gold medal in the men's double trap at the 2011 ISSF World Shotgun Championships, with a total score of 194 targets, earning him a spot on the Chinese team for the Olympics.

Li represented China at the 2012 Summer Olympics in London, where he competed in the men's double trap, along with his teammate and Olympic bronze medalist Hu Binyuan. He scored a total of 134 targets in the qualifying rounds, five points ahead of India's Ronjan Sodhi after the final attempt, finishing in tenth place.

References

External links
NBC Olympics Profile

1985 births
Living people
Chinese male sport shooters
Trap and double trap shooters
Olympic shooters of China
Shooters at the 2012 Summer Olympics
Sport shooters from Shanghai
Asian Games medalists in shooting
Shooters at the 2014 Asian Games
Universiade medalists in shooting
Asian Games silver medalists for China
Medalists at the 2014 Asian Games
Universiade gold medalists for China
Medalists at the 2011 Summer Universiade
21st-century Chinese people